Hopea cernua is a tree in the family Dipterocarpaceae. The specific epithet cernua means "slightly drooping", referring to the flowers.

Description
It has flying (detached) buttress roots. The bark becomes cracked and later fissured.

Distribution and habitat
Hopea cernua is native to Sumatra and Borneo.

Conservation
Hopea cernua has been assessed as endangered on the IUCN Red List. It is threatened by conversion of land for agricultural plantations. It is also threatened by logging for its timber. The species occurs in some protected areas.

References

cernua
Flora of Sumatra
Flora of Borneo
Plants described in 1867